In the NUTS (Nomenclature of Territorial Units for Statistics) codes of Lithuania (LT), the three levels are:

NUTS codes
LT0 Lithuania
LT01  Sostinės regionas
LT011 Vilnius County
LT02 Vidurio ir vakarų Lietuvos regionas
LT021 Alytus County
LT022 Kaunas County
LT023 Klaipėda County
LT024 Marijampolė County
LT025 Panevėžys County
LT026 Šiauliai County
LT027 Tauragė County
LT028 Telšiai County
LT029 Utena County

Local administrative units

Below the NUTS levels, the two LAU (Local Administrative Units) levels are:

The LAU codes of Lithuania can be downloaded here: ''

See also
 Subdivisions of Lithuania
 ISO 3166-2 codes of Lithuania
 FIPS region codes of Lithuania

Sources
 Hierarchical list of the Nomenclature of territorial units for statistics - NUTS and the Statistical regions of Europe
 Overview map of EU Countries - NUTS level 1
 LIETUVA - NUTS level 2
 LIETUVA - NUTS level 3
 Correspondence between the NUTS levels and the national administrative units
 List of current NUTS codes
 Download current NUTS codes (ODS format)
 Counties of Lithuania, Statoids.com

References

Lithuania
 Nuts
Lithuania geography-related lists